The Chua Chu Kang Group Representation Constituency is a four-member Group Representation Constituency located in the western area of Singapore. There are four divisions of the GRC: Choa Chu Kang, Bukit Gombak, Keat Hong and Brickland. Military installations constitute a large part of the constituency, including most of the SAFTI Live Firing Area, Ama Keng and Neo Tiew military training areas and Murai Urban training facility. The current Members of Parliament are Gan Kim Yong, Low Yen Ling, Don Wee and Zhulkarnain Abdul Rahim from the People's Action Party (PAP).

History
Between 1988 and 2011, at the time Chua Chu Kang GRC was formerly called Hong Kah GRC, Chua Chu Kang SMC was one of the oldest surviving constituencies in Singapore and the only one to have both remained intact and existed before Singapore's independence, existed since 1959 when Singapore gained full self-governance from its colonial British Government.

In 2001, Bukit Gombak SMC was absorbed into the former Hong Kah GRC with the town council being Hong Kah Town Council. In 2015, Yew Tee was absorbed into the newly created Marsiling–Yew Tee GRC.

The 2011 elections saw the reformation of both wards with every ward of Hong Kah GRC and Chua Chu Kang being merged into Chua Chu Kang GRC, with the exception of Hong Kah North ward that had been crafted out to become an SMC.

In 2020, the rest of Tengah were moved from Chua Chu Kang GRC to Hong Kah North SMC and all of the Nanyang were shifted to West Coast GRC. The Western Water Catchment, Ama Keng, Wrexham, Poyan, Sarimbun, Lim Chu Kang and Murai were shifted from Nanyang to the newly formed Brickland division.

Town Council

Chua Chu Kang Town Council are operating with the Hong Kah North SMC and the Chua Chu Kang GRC.

Members of Parliament

Electoral results

Elections in 2010s

Elections in 2020s

See also 
Chua Chu Kang SMC

References

External links
2020 General Election's result
2015 General Election's result
2011 General Election's result
2006 General Election's result
2001 General Election's result
1997 General Election's result
1991 General Election's result
1988 General Election's result

Singaporean electoral divisions
Bukit Batok
Choa Chu Kang
Jurong West
Lim Chu Kang
Sungei Kadut
Tengah
Western Water Catchment